Bagdad is a 1949 Technicolor adventure film directed by Charles Lamont starring Maureen O'Hara, Paul Hubschmid (billed as "Paul Christian"), and Vincent Price.

O'Hara called it "a 'tits and sand' picture...one of the films that I point to as part of my decorative years but audiences love them."

Plot
It tells the story of a Bedouin princess (Maureen O'Hara) who returns to Baghdad after being educated in England. She finds that her father has been murdered by a group of renegades. She is hosted by the Pasha (Vincent Price), the corrupt representative of the national government. She is also courted by Prince Hassan (Paul Hubschmid), who is falsely accused of the murder. The plot revolves around her attempts to bring the killer to justice while being courted by the Pasha.

The film was directed by Charles Lamont and included choreography by Lester Horton and Bella Lewitzky.

Cast
 Maureen O'Hara as Princess Marjan
 Paul Hubschmid as Hassan
 Vincent Price as Pasha Ali Nadim
 John Sutton as Raizul
 Jeff Corey as Mohammed Jao
 Frank Puglia as Saleel
 David Bauer as Mahmud (as David Wolfe)
 Fritz Leiber as Emir
 Otto Waldis as Marengo
 Leon Belasco as Beggar
 Anne P. Kramer as Tirza (as Ann Pearce)

Production
In April 1949 Universal announced the film would star Yvonne de Carlo and Swiss actor Paul Christian. It would be Christian's Hollywood debut - he had meant to star in Sword in the Desert but been ruled out due to an eye infection. De Carlo fell ill and so Universal borrowed Maureen O'Hara from 20th Century Fox; it was O'Hara's first film at Universal.

Filming started in June. It took place on location at the Alabama Hills in Lone Pine, California. O'Hara wrote in her memoirs that she was stung by a scorpion a few days into the shoot "but other than that it was an uneventful experience."

Vincent Price appeared in the movie as the last in a four-picture contract he had with Universal. “All through one week’s filming in the blistering sun, take after take was being ruined by the inhuman howls of a lady camel,” wrote Vincent Price in his book The Book of Joe. “No one could make her stop, and the furious reprimand by the sound man to the animal owner brought out the news that the camel must have fallen in love with one of the cast. It couldn’t be anyone she was used to, because it had never happened before and the crew had been around the animals for a week before we arrived. Since there were only three men, including myself, in the company and lady camels fall only for human men, it must be one of us.” After the other two men were presented to the camel with no reaction. “...the moment I appeared the great lumpy beast gave forth with the most disturbing screams of passionate anguish. I was the object of her affection and also the friendly derision of the entire company, but the film was able to continue by eliminating this camel from any scene I was in.”

Reception
According to O'Hara the film "made Universal and fortune and Universal purchased part of my contract from Fox as a result of that success."

References

External links

 
 
 

1949 films
1940s adventure drama films
American adventure drama films
Films directed by Charles Lamont
Films set in Baghdad
Films set in Iraq
Films set in the 19th century
Universal Pictures films
1949 drama films
Films about coups d'état
1940s English-language films
1940s American films